Shane Michael Singh (born ) is an award-winning American journalist. From 2017 to 2019, he was Executive Editor of Playboy. He won the Folio magazine award in 2016 for his piece "My Deportation".

In 2015, Singh wrote an article for Playboy about Tula, a transgender woman who appeared in the publication.

Singh is gay.

In December 2019, he left Playboy and joined The Trevor Project.

In 2023, he became editorial director of United Talent Agency.

References

Further reading

1987 births
American LGBT writers
Living people
Medill School of Journalism alumni
Playboy people